George Kurtz (Born 5 May 1965) is the co-founder and CEO of cybersecurity company CrowdStrike. He was also the founder of Foundstone and chief technology officer of McAfee.

Early life and education
Kurtz grew up in Parsippany-Troy Hills, New Jersey and attended Parsippany High School. He claims that he started programming video games on his Commodore when he was in fourth grade. He went on to build bulletin board systems in high school. He graduated from Seton Hall University with a degree in accounting.

Career

Price Waterhouse and Foundstone
After college, Kurtz began his career at Price Waterhouse as a CPA. In 1993, Price Waterhouse made Kurtz one of its first employees in its new security group. In 1999, he co-wrote Hacking Exposed, a book about cybersecurity for network administrators, with Stuart McClure and Joel Scambray. The book sold more than 600,000 copies and was translated into more than 30 languages. Later that year he started a cybersecurity company, Foundstone, one of the first dedicated security consulting companies. Foundstone focused on vulnerability management software and services and developed a well-recognized incident response practice, with much of the Fortune 100 among its customers.

McAfee
McAfee acquired Foundstone for $86 million in August 2004, with Kurtz assuming the title of senior vice president and general manager of risk management at McAfee. During his tenure, he helped craft the company's strategy for security risk management. In October 2009, McAfee appointed him to the roles of worldwide chief technology officer and executive vice president. In 2010, he participated in Operation Aurora, the investigation of a series of cyber attacks against Google and several other companies. In 2011, he led McAfee's research around the emerging Night Dragon and Shady RAT threats, alongside McAfee's vice president of threat research Dmitri Alperovitch.

Over time, Kurtz became frustrated that existing security technology functioned slowly and was not, as he perceived it, evolving at the pace of new threats. On a flight, he watched the passenger seated next to him wait 15 minutes for McAfee software to load on his laptop, an incident he later cited as part of his inspiration for founding CrowdStrike. He resigned from McAfee in October 2011.

CrowdStrike
In November 2011, Kurtz joined private equity firm Warburg Pincus as an "entrepreneur-in-residence" and began working on his next project, CrowdStrike. He, Gregg Marston (former chief financial officer at Foundstone), and Dmitri Alperovitch co-founded CrowdStrike in Irvine, California, formally announcing the company's launch in February 2012. Kurtz pitched the idea for the company to Warburg Pincus and secured $25 million in funding.

CrowdStrike shifted the focus from anti-malware and antivirus products (McAfee's approach to cybersecurity) to identifying the techniques used by hackers in order to spot incoming threats. The company also developed a "cloud-first" model in order to reduce the software load on customers' computers. CrowdStrike, now headquartered in Sunnyvale, California, attracted public interest in June 2016 for its role in investigating the Democratic National Committee cyber attacks, and in May 2017, the company exceeded a valuation of $1 billion. In 2019, CrowdStrike's $612 million initial public offering on the Nasdaq brought the company to a $6.6 billion valuation under Kurtz's leadership. In July 2020, an IDC report named CrowdStrike as the fastest-growing endpoint security software vendor.

Personal life
In his personal time, he is an avid exotic car collector and has driven Audi R8 LMS GT4 and Mercedes-AMG GT3 in the Pirelli World Challenge. Previously, he raced in the Radical Cup and Sports Car Club of America endurance events. He is currently driving for CrowdStrike Racing.

Racing record

Complete WeatherTech SportsCar Championship results
(key) (Races in bold indicate pole position; results in italics indicate fastest lap)

References

External links
Profile on CrowdStrike's website

1960s births
Living people
Racing drivers from New Jersey
Parsippany High School alumni
People from Parsippany-Troy Hills, New Jersey
American technology executives
24H Series drivers
24 Hours of Daytona drivers
GT World Challenge America drivers
Mercedes-AMG Motorsport drivers
Toksport WRT drivers
WeatherTech SportsCar Championship drivers